|}

The European Free Handicap was a Listed flat horse race in Great Britain open to three-year-old horses. It was run over a distance of 7 furlongs (1,408 metres) on the Rowley Mile at Newmarket in mid-April. In December 2022 the British Horseracing Authority announced that it would not be run in 2023.

The handicap for the race is based on the European Thoroughbred Rankings, an assessment of the previous season's two-year-olds published in January.

History
Records point to the first running of the race being 1929.  It was won by top weight Sir Cosmo carrying 9st. 
The event was formerly known as the Free Handicap. For a period it was backed by the Tote. The word "European" was added to its title in 1981.

The race served as a trial for various Classics in Europe. The last winner to achieve victory in the 2000 Guineas was Mystiko in 1991. The last participant to win the 1000 Guineas was Harayir, the runner-up in 1995.

Records

Leading jockey since 1968 (8 wins):
 Pat Eddery – Charlie Bubbles (1974), Lyric Dance (1979), Danehill (1989), Anshan (1990), Pursuit of Love (1992), So Factual (1993), Cayman Kai (1996), Twilight Blues (2002)

Leading trainer since 1968 (5 wins):
 Richard Hannon Sr. – Bluegrass Prince (1994), Cayman Kai (1996), Cape Town (2000), Kamakiri (2005), Pausanias (2011)

Winners since 1968
 Weights given in stones and pounds.

Earlier winners

 1929: Sir Cosmo
 1930: Quothquan
 1931:
 1932:
 1933:
 1934:
 1935: Knighted
 1936: Pay Up
 1937: Mid-Day Sun
 1938: Lapel
 1939: Solar Cloud
 1940: Salt Spring
 1941: Orthodox
 1942: No Race
 1943: No Race
 1944: Roadhouse
 1945: Grandmaster
 1946: Cama
 1947: Benedictine
 1948: Rear Admiral
 1949: Spy Legend
 1950: The Moke
 1951: Wilwyn
 1952: Caerlaverock
 1953: Good Brandy
 1954: Sun Festival
 1955: Counsel
 1956: Honeylight
 1957: Quorum
 1958: Faultless Speech
 1959: Petite Etoile
 1960: Running Blue
 1961: Erudite
 1962: Privy Councillor
 1963: Ros Rock
 1964: Port Merion
 1965: Short Commons
 1966: Kibenka
 1967: Supreme Sovereign

See also
 Horse racing in Great Britain
 List of British flat horse races

References

 Paris-Turf:
 Racing Post:

 galopp-sieger.de – Newmarket Free Handicap.
 pedigreequery.com – European Free Handicap – Newmarket.

Flat horse races for three-year-olds
Newmarket Racecourse
Flat races in Great Britain